Parabembras robinsoni, the African deep-water flathead, is a species of marine ray-finned fish belonging to the family Bembridae, the deepwater flatheads. It is found in Western Indian Ocean off southeastern Africa.

Taxonomy
The genus Parabembras is sufficiently different from the other genera in that family to be classified as their own family, Parabembradidae, by some authorities. The specific name robinsoni honours John Benjamin Romer Robinson, a South African angler, lawyer and businessman, who gave the type to the British Museum (Natural History).

Description
Parabembras robinsoni has a head and body which is reddish orange and white ventrally. Fins red in colour with pale reddish interradial membranes. A symphyseal knob on the lower jaw present, which is the clear difference from Parabembras curta. Two preocular spine and single robust lachrymal spines present. There are 6–8 supraocular spines, 11 spines in the first dorsal fin. Body cylindrical and posteriorly moderately compressed. Scales ctenoid. Mouth large and slightly oblique.

Distribution and habitat
Parabembras robinsoni is found in the southwestern Indian Ocean from Mozambique to Durban.

References

Fish described in 1921
robinsoni
Taxa named by Charles Tate Regan